The Women's discus throw athletics events for the 2020 Summer Paralympics took place at the Tokyo National Stadium from August 27 to September 4, 2021. A total of 7 events were contested in this discipline.

Schedule

Medal summary
The following is a summary of the medals awarded across all discus throw events.

Results

F11
Records

Prior to this competition, the existing world, Paralympic, and area records were as follows:

Results

The final in this classification took place on 31 August 2021, at 9:34:

F38
Records

Prior to this competition, the existing world, Paralympic, and area records were as follows:

Results

The final in this classification took place on 4 September 2021, at 19:35:

F41
Records

Prior to this competition, the existing world, Paralympic, and area records were as follows:

Results

The final in this classification took place on 1 September 2021, at 9:35:

F53
Records

Prior to this competition, the existing world, Paralympic, and area records were as follows:

Results

The final in this classification took place on 30 August 2021, at 19:10:

F55
Records

Prior to this competition, the existing world, Paralympic, and area records were as follows:

Results

The final in this classification took place on 27 August 2021, at 10:19:

F57
Records

Prior to this competition, the existing world, Paralympic, and area records were as follows:

Results

The final in this classification took place on 28 August 2021, at 9:30:

F64
Records

Prior to this competition, the existing world, Paralympic, and area records were as follows:

Results

The final in this classification took place on 29 August 2021, at 10:17:

References

Athletics at the 2020 Summer Paralympics
2021 in women's athletics